Saint-Pierre-la-Cour is a commune, in the Mayenne department in the north-western of France.

See also
Communes of the Mayenne department

References

Saintpierrelacour
Mayenne communes articles needing translation from French Wikipedia